Dolors Anglada i Sarriera  (1893, in Barcelona – 1984, in Tiana, Province of Barcelona), commonly known as Lola Anglada, was a Spanish writer, comics artist and illustrator.

Biography
Born to a Barcelona family with strong roots in Tiana, she studied at La Llotja de Barcelona with Joan Llaverias and Antoni Utrillo who helped Anglada get her first exposure in the Sala Parés and in the weekly magazine ¡Cu-Cut!, which published her drawings. Later, and for a short period, would enter the academy Francesc d' A. Galí, where she met Joan Miró and Cristōfol Ricard, with the latter establishing close friendships both personally and artistically

At the end of World War I Anglada traveled to Paris thanks to a French Government scholarship, collaborating with several publishing companies there, where she corresponded with Francesc Macià or Josep Clarà. Infused with democratic values and the Catalanist cause, she organized a request of amnesty for the accused participants in the Garraf Plot against the King Alfonso XIII of Spain.

 
During the Spanish Civil War, she joined the UGT and collaborated in the Commissariat of propaganda, with the latter published in the Spanish Civil War (1937) that perhaps its most iconic and recognized Tale: The smallest of all. 
Once the war ended, she settled permanently in Tiana, a town in the Maresme region near Barcelona, in the farm family resort where she died on 12 September 1984.

Artistic works
Versatile, with excellent drawing technique, great sensitivity and a strong Catalanist, Lola Anglada is considered the last of the classical Catalan illustrators of the 20th century and one of the most important writers of the pre-war era.

She collaborated with several children's magazines, including En Jordi, En Patufet,  La Nuri (set up by Anglada herself) and La Mainada. The character that she made most well-known, "El més petit de tots" ("the smallest of all of them"), is a symbol of Catalan national identity of that period.

Awards and legacy
In 1975, she was awarded the Medal of Cultural Merit of the Diputació de Barcelona; in 1980 with the Medal of the Promotion of the Decorative Arts; and in 1981 with the Creu de Sant Jordi, granted by the Generalitat de Catalunya. She gave her collection of dolls to the Diputació de Barcelona, which installed it in the Can Llopis Romanticism Museum of Sitges.

Appointed adoptive daughter of Tiana, the village has also named its private primary school after her. There are also Educational Institutions Lola Anglada in Badalona, L'Hospitalet de Llobregat, Martorell, Esplugues de Llobregat, Vilafranca del Penedès and Lloret de Mar.

Between 1984 and 2003, she granted herself the Prize Lola Anglada of brief stories for boys and girls, summoned by the Caixa de Terrassa and the Town Council of Terrassa.

Her personal collection is preserved in the Photographic Archive of Barcelona.

Works
Contes del Paradís, 1920
En Peret, 1928,  illustrated by herself.
Margarida, 1929 illustrated by herself.
Monsenyor Llangardaix, 1929
Narcís, 1930
El més petit de tots, 1937 illustrated by herself.
La Barcelona dels nostres avis, 1949
La meva casa i el meu jardí, 1958
Martinet, 1960

References

External links
 Webpage devoted to Lola Anglada (lletrA, Catalan Literature Online) 
 About Lola Anglada in www.escriptors.cat 
 Lambiek Comiclopedia article.

Writers from Catalonia
1896 births
1984 deaths
20th-century Spanish women artists
Catalan-language writers
Women writers from Catalonia
Women artists from Catalonia
Spanish female comics artists
Spanish women illustrators
Burials at Poblenou Cemetery